The following is a list of film sound systems.

Explanation
The year shown may represent a patent or other developmental milestone rather than the first use in public.
Technologically identical systems may have been promoted under different trade names by different commercial entities.
The approximate number of films credited to each system is taken from the Internet Movie Database.

Sound systems

See also

Film score
Soundtrack
Sound film
Sound-on-film
Movie projector; sound
List of film formats

References

Resources
Sound mix list on the Internet Movie Database
Index of early sound films of the silent era, from The Progressive Silent Film List by Carl Bennett
The origins of the Firm "Tobis-Klang" The first release that used this system was the partially silent German film Melodie der Welt.

Sound systems
Film sound production